Bubble and squeak is a British dish made from cooked potatoes and cabbage.

Bubble and Squeak may also refer to:

 Bubble and Squeak (video game), a 1994 video game
 Bubble and Squeak (EP), a 1996 album
 Bubble and Squeek, a 1946 cartoon series